Ffairfach railway station serves the village of Ffairfach, near Llandeilo, Carmarthenshire, Wales.

The railway station is located next to the main road Heol Cennen, which crosses the line at its south end. This is the nearest railway station to Carreg Cennen Castle. The former station signal box has been preserved on the Gwili Railway as a working museum exhibit after being made redundant here when the level crossing was automated.

All trains serving the station are operated by Transport for Wales.

Facilities
The station is unstaffed and has a basic range of amenities for passengers, including a small wooden waiting shelter, digital CIS display, timetable poster board and a customer help point. Tickets must be bought on the train or prior to travel. The route from the entrance to the platform has no steps, but is via a narrow gate and steep ramp - as such it is not recommended for use by disabled passengers without assistance.

Services
All trains serving the station are operated by Transport for Wales. There are four trains a day to Shrewsbury northbound from Monday to Saturday (plus a fifth to ) and five southbound to Llanelli & Swansea (the first train in each direction does not run on Saturdays); two services each way call on Sundays.

This is a request stop for northbound trains, whereby passengers have to give a hand signal to the approaching train driver to board or notify the guard when they board that they wish to alight from the train there. Southbound trains are required to stop at the station for the traincrew to operate the level crossing controls.

References

External links 

Railway stations in Carmarthenshire
DfT Category F2 stations
Former Great Western Railway stations
Railway stations in Great Britain opened in 1857
Heart of Wales Line
Railway stations served by Transport for Wales Rail
Railway request stops in Great Britain
1857 establishments in Wales